Juana Isidra Fernández Veras (born May 15, 1971) is a road and track cyclist from the Dominican Republic. She is an eight-time winner of the Dominican Republic National Time Trial Championships, and a two-time winner of the Dominican Republic National Road Race Championships.

Major results
Source: 

2003
 10th Road race, Pan American Games
2007
 1st  Time trial, National Road Championships
2008
 10th Copa Federación Venezolana de Ciclismo
2013
 1st  Time trial, National Road Championships
 4th Road race, Caribbean Road Championships
2014
 1st  Road race, Caribbean Road Championships
 National Road Championships
1st  Time trial
1st  Road race
2015
 1st  Time trial, National Road Championships
2016
 Puerto Rico Track Cup Conacip
1st Omnium
1st Scratch
2nd Keirin
2nd Sprint
 2nd  Road race, Caribbean Road Championships
 National Road Championships
2nd Time trial
2nd  Road race
2017
 National Road Championships
1st  Time trial
2nd Road race
 9th Time trial, Caribbean Road Championships
2018
 National Road Championships
1st  Time trial
2nd Road race
 3rd  Road race, Caribbean Road Championships
2019
 National Road Championships
1st  Time trial
1st  Road race
2021
 Caribbean Road Championships
2nd  Time trial
3rd  Road race
2022
 1st  Time trial, National Road Championships
 8th Time trial, Caribbean Road Championships

References

External links

Dominican Republic female cyclists
1971 births
Living people
Cyclists at the 2003 Pan American Games
Cyclists at the 2019 Pan American Games
Place of birth missing (living people)
Pan American Games competitors for the Dominican Republic